The Love of Hetty Raimond (German: Die Liebe von Hetty Raimond) is a 1917 German silent drama film directed by Mia May, Bruno Decarli and Heinrich Peer.

Cast
 Mia May as Hetty Raymond 
 Bruno Decarli as Hans van Gent 
 Heinrich Peer as Dr. Jacques Seeberg 
 Fritz Sachs as Werksleiter 
 Emmy Flemmich

References

Bibliography
 Jill Nelmes & Jule Selbo. Women Screenwriters: An International Guide. Palgrave Macmillan, 2015.

External links
 

1917 films
Films of the German Empire
Films directed by Joe May
German silent feature films
German drama films
German black-and-white films
1917 drama films
1910s business films
Silent drama films
1910s German films